William Harold "Spot" Collins (March 4, 1922 – March 26, 1996) was a college and professional football player and coach in the 1940s. Collins played one year of professional football for the NFL's Boston Yanks in 1947 and was head football coach at Southwestern in 1948–49. He is one of only 14 NFL players to serve in both World War II and the Korean War.

Early life
William Harold Collins was a star in football, baseball and basketball at Breckenridge High School, which he attended from 1936 to 1940. He led the football team to a district championship in his senior year and was 2nd Team All-State the same year. When the season was over, he played in the annual Texas High School Football Coaches Association All-Star game.

College football
He first attended the University of Texas in 1940 where, in his freshman year, he was captain of the "Shorthorn" football team – the freshman team. They went undefeated and won the unofficial conference championship.

In 1941 he played guard on the varsity and earned a letter despite missing the end of the season with a knee injury.  That season marked the first time that a Texas team would ever be ranked No. 1 in the polls, if only for a week before tying Baylor and losing to TCU in back to back weeks. The Longhorns finished 8–1–1 and ranked No. 4 in the country. It was the first time Texas ever finished the season ranked.

In 1942 Collins was moved to quarterback, which in the single-wing formation was also known as the "blocking back". The quarterback did not pass or handle the ball as much as they do in modern offenses, but did call the plays. On defense, he played linebacker. After starting slowly to allow his knee to heal, Collins took over the starting job from Joe Magliolo because he was seen as the better pass defender and the Longhorns started to play against more pass-oriented offenses in the Southwest Conference.  He helped lead Texas to the conference title, a No. 11 ranking and their first bowl game, the 1943 Cotton Bowl. He was recognized as an All-Southwest Conference 2nd Team player as a back.

Following the 1942 season, he joined the Marine Corps and, along with eight other Longhorns, was sent to Southwestern University as part of the V-12 program. There he was captain of the most successful Pirates football team in school history, a team that beat Texas in Austin, was ranked as high as No. 11, and won the 1943 Sun Bowl, in which Collins was named MVP. Though the Texas Conference was officially disbanded during the war, the school considers themselves Texas Conference Champions that year.

He left college and football to go into service during World War II. He was a first lieutenant with the Sixth Marines at Okinawa and China.

In 1946 he returned to the University of Texas, but with Texas' transition to the t-formation a blocking back was no longer needed, so he was moved back to offensive guard. Despite his years away from Austin, he was named co-captain of the football team as the Longhorns went 8–2. He was again recognized as an All-Southwest Conference 2nd Team player this time as a guard. Following the season, he played in the 1947 East-West all star game in San Francisco and the College All-Star game in Chicago.

Professional football
In 1947, after getting a degree, he was selected in the third round of the 1947 AAFC Draft by the New York Yankees, but never played for them. Instead he spent the 1947 season in the NFL with the Boston Yanks for whom he played guard.

Coaching and later life
With his professional football career over, Collins was hired as head football coach at Southwestern University in the spring of 1948. He coached the Pirates for two years, for a combined 8–10–2 record, before leaving for the military again in 1951. He served in the Korean War, where he earned the Bronze Star Medal. He was one of only 14 NFL players to serve in both World War II and the Korean War. After returning from the war, Collins was hired as the head coach at Vernon High School from 1952 to 1954, where his teams posted a combined record of 14–13–3. He earned a master's degree in education from Texas in 1954 and then entered the insurance industry in Austin in 1956 where he worked until his retirement.

Collins died on March 26, 1996, in Temple, Texas, and was buried at Austin Memorial Park Cemetery.

He was inducted into the Southwestern University Athletics Hall of Fame in 1997.

Head coaching record

Bibliography

Notes

References 

 
 

 
  –

External links
 

1922 births
1996 deaths
American football offensive linemen
American football quarterbacks
Boston Yanks players
Southwestern Pirates baseball coaches
Southwestern Pirates football coaches
University of Texas at Austin alumni
Texas Longhorns football players
United States Marine Corps personnel of World War II
United States Marine Corps personnel of the Korean War
United States Marine Corps officers
People from Breckenridge, Texas
Players of American football from Texas
Military personnel from Texas